WHLV-TV (channel 52) is a religious television station licensed to Cocoa, Florida, United States, serving the Orlando area as an owned-and-operated station of the  Trinity Broadcasting Network (TBN). The station's studios are located adjacent to the Holy Land Experience, a Christian theme park also owned by TBN; its transmitter is located in unincorporated Bithlo, Florida.

History
The station was founded August 16, 1982 as WTGL-TV by Good Life Broadcasting (WTGL stands for "The Good Life"). The station was initially a blend of family-type general entertainment programming such as classic cartoons, westerns, classic sitcoms and old movies, as well as Christian programming.

WTGL was at a severe disadvantage, since it was licensed in Brevard County. As a result, even though its transmitter was located as close to Orlando as possible while staying within  of Cocoa (as required by Federal Communications Commission regulations of the time), Orlando only got a grade B signal. The market's second-largest city, Daytona Beach, barely got any signal at all. As a result, WTGL began dropping most of its secular programming by 1984, and by 1985 became an affiliate of the Clearwater-based Christian Television Network, becoming the network's second station alongside flagship WCLF in Clearwater. In the mid-1990s, a small amount of entertainment programming was added. The station would end its affiliation with CTN in the late 1990s, but it continued to operate as a predominantly religious station, changing its affiliations to the Total Living Network and Faith TV.

On December 12, 2000, after the FCC began to permit duopolies, Good Life Broadcasting signed on a second station, WLCB-TV (channel 45). WLCB aired a mix of Christian shows, public domain movies, public domain episodes of some shows, as well as low budget classic sitcoms, sports shows, and lifestyle programming. WTGL continued on with a mostly Christian format.

On September 28, 2006, it was announced that WTGL-TV had been sold to the Trinity Broadcasting Network.  Good Life Broadcasting continued to control the original WTGL's master control operations. The two stations shared a studio at the corner of Michigan Street and I-4 in Orlando until June 2007, when then-WLCB and the master control for what was then WTGL moved to the former studios of WKCF in Lake Mary.

In July 2007, WTGL's calls were changed to its current calls, WHLV-TV. This made the WTGL callsign available to the former WLCB, which officially took the WTGL calls in mid-September 2007.

Under the previous ownership of Good Life Broadcasting, then-WTGL-TV applied for a digital signal on channel 53, but the request was dismissed on account of the station's license being put up for sale (Good Life Broadcasting effectively moved the intellectual unit of the original WTGL-TV to what was then WLCB-TV, which today bears the WTGL call sign).

On January 22, 2009, WHLV's analog transmitter experienced a tube failure—the same problem which reduced the analog signal of WKCF to 60 percent of its authorized power. Unlike most other TBN owned-and-operated stations (which went digital exclusive on April 16, 2009), WHLV continued operating its analog transmitter at half of its licensed power under a Special Temporary Authority until the June 12 changeover date. On that day, WHLV activated its post-transition channel 51 digital transmitter after WOGX in nearby Ocala, Florida ceased analog transmissions on that channel.

In June 2009, channels 52.2–52.5 were initially added to the digital lineup, but for unknown reasons the channels remained dark and carried no actual programming until August 15, 2010 when they finally began to pass TBN multiplex programming. At that point, master control was turned over to TBN. Since then, the station, like most other TBN O&Os, has essentially been a pass-through for automated TBN programming.

Technical information

Subchannels

Analog-to-digital conversion
WHLV-TV shut down its analog signal, over UHF channel 52, on June 12, 2009, the official date in which full-power television stations in the United States transitioned from analog to digital broadcasts under federal mandate. The station's digital signal continued to broadcasts on its pre-transition UHF channel 51. Through the use of PSIP, digital television receivers display the station's virtual channel as its former UHF analog channel 52, which was among the high band UHF channels (52-69) that were removed from broadcasting use as a result of the transition.

References

External links 
TBN website

Television channels and stations established in 1982
Christianity in Orlando, Florida
Trinity Broadcasting Network affiliates
HLV-TV
1982 establishments in Florida
Cocoa, Florida